Dmitar Nemanjić (also Dimitrije) was a Serbian Prince, the son of Vukan Nemanjić and the nephew of King Stefan II the First-Crowned. He is venerated as Saint David Nemanjić with the title of the Venerable (Prepodobni) in the Serbian Orthodox Church.

Life
He was the son of Vukan Nemanjić, he had two brothers Đorđe and Stefan. In April 1271, he asked Emperor Michael VIII to grant the Chilandar a possession of the Struma river. He then took monastic vows, under the name David. He had the Davidovica Monastery near Brodarevo on the Lim river built in August 1281, with the help of masons of Dubrovnik. He is mentioned in 1286 when he travelled to Jerusalem on a pilgrimage.

He had a son, Vratislav. His grandson Vratko is the father of Princess Milica. He is venerated every September 24 (October 7 on the new calendar) in the Serbian Orthodox Church.

See also 

Nemanjić family tree
List of Serbian saints

References
Discover Serbia: Davidovica monastery

13th-century Serbian royalty
Medieval Serbian Orthodox clergy
Nemanjić dynasty
13th-century births
13th-century Eastern Orthodox Christians
Year of death unknown
Serbian saints of the Eastern Orthodox Church